Springfield Township is a township in Henry County, in the U.S. state of Missouri.

The township's name is a transfer from Springfield, Ohio.

References

Townships in Missouri
Townships in Henry County, Missouri